Ahmed Fellah (born November 14, 1982) is an Algerian football player who plays for ASM Oran in the Algerian Ligue Professionnelle 1. Fellah has spent his entire career in Algeria, he has had spells at NARB Réghaïa, CR Belouizdad, MC Oran, CA Bordj Bou Arréridj, RC Arbaâ and currently with ASM Oran. He won the 2008–09 Algerian Cup with Belouizdad. He scored his first professional goal in 2009 when he scored the winner against AS Khroub.

Club career

Early career
Fellah started his career in Reghaïa with NARB Réghaïa in Algerian Ligue Professionnelle 2, he stayed in Reghaïa until 2007 when he completed a move to top-flight Algerian Ligue Professionnelle 1 club CR Belouizdad. Fellah had three years with Belouizdad where he won the Algerian Cup in 2008–09 and scored a goal. His only career goal to date came on 14 May 2015 when he scored a penalty to win the match for Belouizdad. He left the club in 2010.

MC Oran
After leaving Belouizdad, Fellah joined MC Oran. He made his league debut against USM Blida on 25 September 2010 in a 0–0 away draw. He received his first career red card on 3 December when he was sent off in Oran's 0–0 draw with ES Sétif. In total, he made seventeen appearances in his debut season for Oran. In the following season, Fellah started twenty-one of the club's thirty Ligue 1 fixtures. Exactly one year after Fellah was red carded against Sétif on 3 December 2010, he was again given his marching orders on 3 December 2011 when referee Rafik Achouri gave him his second yellow card in the 84th minute but Oran managed to hold on for a 1–0 win against JSM Béjaïa. His final appearance for Oran was a 1–5 home defeat to CA Batna. He left at the end of the season.

CA Bordj Bou Arréridj
Fellah joined the third club of his career for the 2012–13 Algerian Ligue Professionnelle 1 season when he signed for newly promoted CA Bordj Bou Arréridj. He made his debut for Bordj Bou Arréridj against the team that his last MC Oran appearance came against – CA Batna. He had a better afternoon against Batna this time as he and his team drew 1–1 with the Batna based club. Overall, Fellah played just under half of Bordj Bou Arréridj's Ligue 1 matches and he subsequently left at the end of that campaign.

RC Arbaâ
Next came a move to RC Arbaâ, another newly promoted team. His first Arbaâ appearance came against his former club Belouizdad, the match against Belouizdad was the start of sixteen matches in his first year (2013–14) at Arbaâ. In 2014–15, Fellah played the most matches in a season in his career as he started twenty-three of the thirty league fixtures for Arbaâ. He completed the 90 minutes in all but one match for the club, he left the match on 20 September 2014 against USM Alger early due to him picking up his third career red card in the 95th minute. He played the full match in the 2014–15 Algerian Cup final, a game that Arbaâ lost 1–0 at the Stade Mustapha Tchaker to MO Béjaïa.

ASM Oran
On 1 July 2015, Fellah joined ASM Oran. He made his debut on 15 August versus USM Blida.

Career statistics
.

Honours
Fellah won the 2008–09 Algerian Cup, which is the sole honour in his career so far.

CR Belouizdad
Algerian Cup: 2008–09

References

External links
 
 

1982 births
Living people
People from Tiaret Province
Algerian Ligue Professionnelle 1 players
CR Belouizdad players
MC Oran players
CA Bordj Bou Arréridj players
RC Arbaâ players
NARB Réghaïa players
Association football goalkeepers
ASM Oran players
Algerian footballers
21st-century Algerian people